The Quality of Mercy or Quality of Mercy may refer to:

 "The quality of mercy" (Shakespeare quote), a notable speech in William Shakespeare's play The Merchant of Venice

Television and films
 "A Quality of Mercy", an episode of the science-fiction television series Twilight Zone
 "A Quality of Mercy", an episode of the science-fiction television series Star Trek: Strange New Worlds
 "Quality of Mercy" (The Outer Limits), an episode of the science-fiction television series The Outer Limits
 Quality of Mercy (TV series), a 1975 Australian TV series
 "The Quality of Mercy" (Babylon 5), an episode of the science-fiction television series Babylon 5
 The Quality of Mercy (film), a 1994 Austrian film
 The Quality of Mercy, a 2002 film starring Mary-Louise Parker
 "The Quality of Mercy", an episode of the television series Early Edition
 "The Quality of Mercy", an episode of season 6 of the television series Mad Men
 "The Quality of Mercy", an episode of the television series Lewis

Books
 The Quality of Mercy, a Socialist novel by William Dean Howells, published in 1892
 The Quality of Mercy: An Autobiography, by American actress Mercedes McCambridge, published in 1981
 The Quality of Mercy, an historical novel by Faye Kellerman, published in 1989
 The Quality of Mercy: Personal Essays on Mormon Experience, a book by Eugene England, published in 1992
 The Quality of Mercy, a mystery by Gilbert Morris, published in 1993
 The Quality of Mercy, a mystery by David Roberts, published in 2006
 The Quality of Mercy: Cambodia, Holocaust and Modern Conscience, by William Shawcross#, published in 1984
 "The Quality of Mercy" (Unsworth novel), an historical novel by Barry Unsworth, published in 2011

Music
 The Quality of Mercy Is Not Strnen, a 1979 album by The Mekons
 The Quality of Mercy (album), a 2005 album by Steve Harley & Cockney Rebel
 "Quality of Mercy", a song by Michelle Shocked